Agdistis uncirectangula is a moth in the family Pterophoridae. It is known from Ningxia, China.

The wingspan is 25–26 mm. The head has a brown, small frontal tuft. The forewings are darkish-grey and the hindwings are grey. The legs are greyish white and slender.

Etymology
The specific name is derived from the Latin unc- (meaning hook-like) and rectangulus (meaning rectangular) in reference to the shape of uncus in male genitalia.

References

Agdistinae
Moths described in 2003